Matt Larsen is a former United States Marine, United States Army Ranger and Black Belt Magazine Hall of Fame combatives instructor. He is known as "The Father of Modern Combatives", credited with the creation of the United States Army's modern combatives doctrine and the establishment of the U.S. Army Combatives School. Larsen is also a Evolutionary Psychologist specializing in Combat Psychology, and is currently the Director of Combatives at the United States Military Academy at West Point.

Military service
Larsen enlisted in the United States Marine Corps as an infantryman in 1984. He was stationed overseas in Kanagawa Prefecture, Japan with the Marine detachment at Naval Air Facility Atsugi. During this time Larsen began training in judo, Shotokan karate, and traditional boxing. He continued his training in martial arts when he was transferred to Okinawa with the 3rd Battalion 5th Marine Regiment. He trained in Shōbayashi Shōrin-ryū with Eizo Shimabukuro and continued his judo training. He also trained Sayoc Kali in the Philippines. During this time Larsen fought in the Japan Karate Association's All Japan Karate Championships, Muay Thai bouts in Thailand, and a bare-knuckle fight against the ROK Marines Taekwondo champion. He was also a member of the 3rd Marine Division's boxing team.

Upon his discharge from the Marine Corps, Larsen enlisted in the United States Army. He went on to join the 75th Ranger Regiment, where he would remain for the next 14 years. Initially assigned to 1st Ranger Battalion at Hunter Army Airfield, Larsen parachuted into Panama with the Rangers during Operation Just Cause and was also involved in Ranger operations during the Gulf War. He began to involve himself more in combat sports and served as the president of the 1st Ranger Battalion's practical shooting club. Upon his reassignment to the 2nd Ranger Battalion, he started the Battalion's practical shooting club. He soon found himself as the Non-Commissioned Officer in Charge of combatives and Close Quarters Battle (CQB) training for the battalion. He utilized his martial arts training, having attained black belts in several disciplines including Brazilian Jiu-jitsu under Romero "Jacare" Cavalcanti and Russian Sambo, and merged them into a single, effective fighting style. As the program grew more elaborate, he became the NCOIC of combatives and CQB training for the entire 75th Ranger Regiment. During his service with the Rangers, he established himself as the Army's subject matter expert on combatives. When the opportunity to shape the Army's Combatives program came, he transferred to the Ranger Training Brigade, which was charged with the development of the combatives doctrine. During this time, he refined his training methods and started to compile a comprehensive training manual.

Larsen was asked to move to the 11th Infantry Regiment to design a combatives instructor training course for their cadre. As the 11th Infantry Regiment would soon have a more rigorous training regimen, taught by the Army's subject matter expert on combatives, the proponency for combatives doctrine moved with him. His ideas were well received by the 11th Infantry Regiment and he found himself with an old warehouse that he utilized as a combatives training facility. Within a short time, the school became so successful that units from throughout the Army began sending their soldiers. Several new courses had to be developed in order to continue teaching beyond the initial course, with the idea of building programs within these units. Eventually the school was recognized by the Army as the "United States Army Combatives School". In 2002, the training manual which he had been working on since his time with the Ranger Training Brigade was published by the Army as Field Manual 3–25.150 (Combatives).

In March 2005, Larsen was inducted into the Order of Saint Maurice at the Centurion level.

Brazilian Jiu-Jitsu instructor lineage 
Jigoro Kano → Tsunejiro Tomita → Mitsuyo "Count Koma" Maeda → Carlos Gracie, Sr. → Helio Gracie → Rolls Gracie → Romero "Jacaré" Cavalcanti → Matt Larsen.

After military career
After retiring from the Army, Larsen worked as a private contractor in Afghanistan and Iraq before being hired by the Army as the Director of the Modern Army Combatives Program (MACP) and the Commandant of the US Army Combatives School (USACS), which he established at Fort Benning, Georgia.

Combatives
In 2007 he helped the United States Army Special Forces Qualification Course revamp their Combatives curriculum and was an advisor to the US Air Force, who adopted his program in early 2008. In 2008 Larsen designed the Combatives training program for the Canadian Special Operations Regiment. In 2009 he consulted with both the Royal Marine Commandos at the training base in Lympstone, Devon, as well as the British Army's infantry at the Infantry Training Centre Catterick on the development of their Combatives programs.

He was featured on the cover of the September 2010 issue of Black Belt Magazine in a two-part article continued in the October issue.

Larsen was inducted into the Black Belt Magazine Hall of Fame as the self defense instructor of the year in December 2013.

In 2016 Larsen was asked by the United Arab Emirates to help add some institutional organization to their efforts to make Brazilian Jiu-Jitsu their national sport. He wrote a manual and conducted classes with the over three hundred black belts who conduct instruction in the school system.

In 2017 Larsen was invited by the Kuwait Police Special Forces to help create a unit Combatives program.

on July 4th, 2022 the Combatives Belt System was opened up to people outside of the Army through an online system of proving fighting ability, shooting ability, strength, and trauma medicine training to a board made up of Combatives black belts.

LHR combat knife
In 2006 Larsen collaborated with knife designers William Harsey, Jr. and Chris Reeve, who designed and make the Yarborough knife presented to graduates of the Special Forces Qualification course, to develop the LHR Combat Knife based on the lessons from hand-to-hand fighting in Iraq and Afghanistan. It is manufactured by Gerber Legendary Blades.

After leaving the USACS, he returned to Iraq as a contractor in 2011 to help train units on how to effectively employ knives during close-quarters combat.

Books
In 2008 and 2009 Larsen rewrote the US Army Survival Handbook and the U.S. Military Pocket Survival Guide: Plus Evasion & Recovery for the publisher Lyons Press.

In 2010 Larsen co-authored Sniper: American Single-Shot Warriors in Iraq and Afghanistan, with war correspondent Gina Cavallaro with a foreword written by the 31st Vice Chief of Staff of the Army Gen. (Ret.) Richard A. Cody, architect of the Asymmetric Warfare Group and former commander of the 101st Airborne Division (Air Assault) and the 160th Special Operations Aviation Regiment. The book is a collection of stories and impressions from dozens of snipers – soldiers and Marines, including Rangers and Special Forces soldiers – who fought in Iraq and Afghanistan.

In 2013 Larsen published Modern Army Combatives: Battle-Proven Techniques and Training Methods from Black Belt Books.

In 2018 Larsen published "The Official U.S. Army Combat Skills Handbook"  from the publisher Lyons Press

Military Contracting
In June 2011 Larsen was in Libya assessing the rebel forces.

In 2013 Larsen opened a gym in Springfield, Virginia named "Matt Larsen's Combat Fitness Center". He later changed the name to ML Combatives Academy.

Larsen worked as the regional director for Africa for an American security company. He was based in Lusaka, Zambia.

West Point
In August 2017 Larsen was appointed as the Director of Combatives for the United States Military Academy at West Point.

References

External links

 Combatives University
 FM3-25.150
 Ultimate Grappling article
 Realfighting Article
 Black Belt Magazine
 NCO Journal
 New York Times

United States Army Rangers
Living people
American martial artists
United States Army soldiers
United States Army personnel of the Gulf War
1967 births
Recipients of the Order of Saint Maurice
United States Marines
Shōrin-ryū practitioners